Johann Paul Geycke (1726 – 1804 in Hamburg) was a Hamburg organ builder of the 18th century.

Geycke ran his own workshop in Hamburg. Georg Wilhelm Wilhelmy (1748–1806) was his journeyman. From 1765 onwards, Geycke succeeded in persuading the itzehoer organ builder Johann Daniel Busch (1735–1787) from Hamburg.

His son Joachim Wilhelm Geycke (1768–1840) continued his father's workshop. His grandson was the Hamburg organ builder Christian Heinrich Wolfsteller (1830–1897), his son-in-law the organ builder Balthasar Wohlien (1745–1804) from the well-known Altonaer  family of organ builders.

Work

References

Further reading

External links 
 Foto des von Geycke gebauten Spieltisches in der Hauptkirche Sankt Jacobi

German pipe organ builders
1726 births
1804 deaths
Place of birth missing